Graeme Sullivan is an Australian artist, author, art theorist, and educator. He has contributed work to numerous exhibitions and events and is known for his international "Streetworks" project that plants public art in unusual urban locales. He authored the books Art Practice as Research (2005) and Seeing Australia: Views of Artists and Artwriters (1994). He has served as an editorial board member and consultant to the International Journal of Art & Design Education, the International Journal of Education and the Arts, and Studies in Material Thinking. Sullivan, who graduated from Ohio State University in 1984 with both a Master of Arts and a PhD, has taught art at the University of New South Wales's College of Fine Arts, and the Teacher's College at Columbia University. He is the current director of the School of Visual Arts at Pennsylvania State University.

Education
Sullivan attended Ohio State University in Columbus, Ohio where he earned his Master of Arts and later graduated with a PhD in art education in 1984. Sullivan's scholarly interests include visualization in the art process, studio-based research methods and theory for different art disciplines.

Artistic career
Streetworks (1995–present)
In the early 1990s Sullivan began creating "Streetworks", unique conceptual art pieces built from materials he picked up from gutters and sidewalks. Under the guise of semi-anonymity, he constructs the pieces on specific sites such as subway stations, abandoned buildings, parks, bridges, and other locations. While the pieces have mainly appeared in the New York City boroughs of Manhattan and Brooklyn, they have also appeared in Boston, Tokyo, Venice, Beijing, the Bahamas, and Sydney.

Exhibitions
Throughout his career Sullivan's art has been featured in numerous shows and exhibitions. In March 2010 Sullivan contributed art pieces to the international traveling exhibit Global Perspectives: Works on Paper. In New York City it displayed in the Broadway Gallery, and also featured such artists as May Stevens. In April 2010 he participated in the exhibition Art is Me, Art is You at the Korean Cultural Center, Los Angeles. The show included a public art walk performance where the artists symbolically 'wore' their artwork.

Teaching career

University of New South Wales (1988-1998) 
In 1988, Sullivan joined the faculty at the University of New South Wales in Kensington, Australia, where he remained for over ten years. He served as a senior lecturer in art education in their College of Fine Arts.

Critical Influence CD (1998)
In 1998, Sullivan produced a CD-ROM entitled Critical Influence: A Visual Arts Research Project, which documented two contemporary artists preparing for an exhibition, and explored the influences and contexts between their separate art practices. Made while at the University of New South Wales, it was intended to accompany an exhibition called Critical Influence at the Ivan Dougherty Gallery in February and March 1998.

Columbia University (1999-2009)
In January 1999, Sullivan departed from the University of New South Wales to join the faculty in the Department of Arts and Humanities at Teachers College, Columbia University. He served as Chair of the Department of Arts & Humanities, as well as associate professor of art education.

Lecturing history 
InSEA World Congress (2002)
In 2002 Sullivan served on the Congress Executive Committee of InSEA's 31st World Congress in New York City.

On 4 November 2005, Sullivan presented "Research Acts in the Visual Arts" as part of the John M. Anderson Lecture Series at the Pennsylvania State University School of Visual Arts. Three years later, on 7 and 8 March 2008, Sullivan served as a keynote speaker at NYU Steinhardt in Greenwich Village. On 2 February 2009, he was sponsored by the Interdisciplinary Research Group from the College of Visual and Performing Arts at Syracuse University to present the lecture "The Artist as Research Trickster". He presented "Art Practice as Research: New Roles for New Realities" at Moravian College in Bethlehem, Pennsylvania on 11 November 2009. The lecture was part of the Rose and Rudy S. Ackerman Visual Arts Lecture Series.

Penn State University (2010-present) 
Effective 1 August 2010, Sullivan was appointed director of Pennsylvania State University's School of Visual Arts. He is also a professor of art education at the college.

Writing/editing career
Seeing Australia (1994)
Sullivan is the author of Seeing Australia: Views of Artists and Artwriters, a paperback book released on Piper Press in 1994. It was also published as a poster book in 1994, and there was a second reprinting in 1996.

Art Practice as Research (2005, 2010)
In 2005 Sullivan published the book Art Practice as Research: Inquiry in the Visual Arts, which described many of his artistic philosophies on education and research in detail. It was published by SAGE Publications on both paperback and hardback. The book later underwent a major update and revision and was republished early in 2010. His research partly investigates the thinking process, making processes, and practices used in visual arts. He presents the argument that the creative and cultural inquiry undertaken by artists is a form of research.

Articles
Sullivan has written numerous articles focusing on visual research practices in art and education, published in the United States, the United Kingdom, Europe, Australia, and Asia. He has held editorial positions with both Studies in Art Education and Australian Art Education. He is also an editorial board member and consultant to the UK publication International Journal of Art & Design Education, the International Journal of Education and the Arts, and Studies in Material Thinking. He has served as senior editor for Studies in Art Education, the research journal of the NAEA.

He has contributed numerous chapters to books and text books, as well as editorials to peer-reviewed journals such as Studies in Art Education and Australian Art Education. He also contributed articles to Artlink in 1999 and Art in Education in 1988 and 1986.

In 2004 he was listed in Who's Who in America.

Memberships 
National Art Education Association (NAEA)
American Educational Research Association
College Art Association
Australian Institute of Art Education (life membership as of 1997)

Awards
Manual Barkan Memorial Award 1990 – NAEA (for scholarly writing)
Ken Marantz Distinguished Alumni Award 1999 – Ohio State University
Lowenfeld Award 2007 (for significant contribution to the art education profession)

Bibliography
Books
Seeing Australia: Views of Artists and Artwriters (1994)
Art Practice as Research: Inquiry in the Visual Arts edition 1 (2005)
Art Practice as Research: Inquiry in the Visual Arts edition 2 (2010)

Chapters
Contemporary issues in art education for elementary educators (2002), (pp. 23–38)
Handbook of research and policy in art education (2004), (pp. 795–814)
Howard Gardner Under Fire: A Rebel Psychologist Faces His Critics (2006) (pp. 198–222)
International Handbook of Research on Arts Education, Part 2 (2007), (pp. 1181–1194)
Art Education as Critical Cultural Inquiry, (2007) (pp. 58–74)
Being with A/r/tography (2007) (pp. 233–244)
Handbook of The Arts in Qualitative Research: Perspectives, Methodologies, Examples, and Issues (2007) (pp. 239 – 250)

References

External links
Streetworksart 
Art Practice as Research online project
wood meets paper blog

20th-century Australian artists
Living people
Ohio State University College of Education and Human Ecology alumni
Academic staff of the University of New South Wales
Australian expatriates in the United States
Teachers College, Columbia University faculty
Australian magazine editors
Pennsylvania State University faculty
21st-century Australian artists
20th-century Australian male writers
Australian art teachers
Year of birth missing (living people)
21st-century Australian male writers